Jamaica competed at the 1980 Summer Olympics in Moscow, USSR. 18 competitors, 11 men and 7 women, took part in 15 events in 2 sports. The Russian alphabet and Japan's participation in the American-led boycott of the games placed it last before the host nation in the Parade of Nations.

Medalists

Bronze
 Don Quarrie — Athletics, Men's 200 metres
 Merlene Ottey-Page — Athletics, Women's 200 metres
 David Weller — Cycling, Men's 1.000 metres Time Trial

Athletics

Men's 100 metres
Don Quarrie
 Heat — 10.37
 Quarterfinals — 10.29
 Semifinals — 10.55 (→ did not advance)

Men's 800 metres
Owen Hamilton
 Heat — 1:49.3 
 Semifinals — 1:47.6 (→ did not advance)

Men's 4x400 metres Relay
 Derrick Peynado, Colin Bradford, Ian Stapleton, and Bert Cameron
 Heat — did not finish (→ did not advance)

Men's High Jump
Desmond Morris
 Qualification — 2.10 m (→ did not advance)

Women's 100 metres
 Rosie Allwood
 Heat — 11.68
 Quarterfinals — 11.69 (→ did not advance)

 Lelieth Hodges
 Heat — 11.79 (→ did not advance)

Women's Long Jump
 Dorothy Scott
 Qualifying Round — 5.83 m (→ did not advance, 17th place)

Cycling

Two cyclists represented Jamaica in 1980. David Weller won bronze in the 1000m time trial event.

Individual road race
 Peter Aldridge

1000m time trial
 David Weller

References

External links
Official Olympic Reports
International Olympic Committee results database

Nations at the 1980 Summer Olympics
1980 Summer Olympics
1980 in Jamaican sport